Portico di Caserta is a comune (municipality) in the Province of Caserta in the Italian region Campania, located about  north of Naples and about  southwest of Caserta.

References

Cities and towns in Campania